XHRHI-FM is a community radio station in Uruapan, Michoacán, broadcasting on 107.9 FM. XHRHI is owned by Uandárhi, A.C., and is a member of AMARC México.

History
The station takes its name from the Purépecha word uandárhi, which means "communication agents".

XHRHI came to air after receiving its permit in December 2004. In 2019, the station was approved to increase power to 3,000 watts.

References

Radio stations in Michoacán
Community radio stations in Mexico
Radio stations established in 2004